The Orgelbüchlein (Little Organ Book) BWV 599−644 is a set of 46 chorale preludes for organ — one of them is given in two versions — by Johann Sebastian Bach. All but three were written between 1708 and 1717 when Bach served as organist to the ducal court in Weimar; the remainder and a short two-bar fragment came no earlier than 1726, after the composer’s appointment as cantor at the Thomasschule in Leipzig.

The plan was for a collection of 164 settings of chorale tunes sung during the Church year so that each part of the year was represented. This number was not to be. The manuscript, which is now in the Staatsbibliothek, leaves a number of tunes as missing or "ghost" pieces. These have been added in the 21st century; this project took nine hours in the first complete performance, giving an idea of the potential scope of Bach's "little" book. The Orgelbüchlein as Bach left it is about 80 minutes. However, it spans the calendar and more importantly signals a maturity and new breadth in his compositional style, not only with regard to this instrument. 

Each setting takes an existing Lutheran chorale, adds a motivic accompaniment, and quite freely explores form. Many of the preludes are short and in four parts, requiring only a single keyboard and pedal, with an unadorned cantus firmus. Others involve two keyboards and pedal. These include several canons, four ornamental four-part preludes with elaborately decorated chorale lines, and one prelude in trio sonata form.

Title page

Orgel-Büchlein
Worrine einem anfahenden Organisten
Anleitung gegeben wird, auff allerhand
Arth einen Choral durchzuführen, an-
bey auch sich im Pedal studio zu habi-
litiren, indem in solchen darinne
befindlichen Choralen das Pedal
gantz obligat tractiret wird.
Dem Höchsten Gott allein' zu Ehren,
Dem Nechsten, draus sich zu belehren.
Autore
Joanne Sebast. Bach
p. t. Capellae Magistri
S. P. R. Anhaltini-
Cotheniensis.
Little Organ Book
In which a beginning organist
receives given instruction as to performing
a chorale in a multitude of ways while
achieving mastery in the study of the pedal,
since in the chorales contained herein
the pedal is treated entirely obbligato.

In honour of our Lord alone
That my fellow man his skill may hone.
Composed by
Johann Sebastian Bach
Capellmeister
to his Serene Highness the Prince of Anhalt-
Cöthen

History

Bach's formal training as a musician started when he was enrolled as a chorister at the Michaelskirche in Lüneburg in 1700–1702. Manuscripts in Bach's hand recently discovered in Weimar by the Bach scholars Peter Wollny and Michael Maul show that while in Lüneburg he studied the organ with Georg Böhm, composer and organist at the Johanniskirche. The documents are hand copies made in Böhm's home in tablature format of organ compositions by Reincken, Buxtehude and others. They indicate that already at the age of 15 Bach was an accomplished organist, playing some of the most demanding repertoire of the period. After a brief spell in Weimar as court musician in the chapel of Johann Ernst, Duke of Saxe-Weimar, Bach was appointed as organist at St. Boniface's Church (now called the Bachkirche) in Arnstadt in the summer of 1703, having inspected and reported on the organ there earlier in the year. In 1705–1706 he was granted leave from Arnstadt to study with the organist and composer Dieterich Buxtehude in Lübeck, a pilgrimage he famously made on foot. In 1707 Bach became organist at St. Blasius' Church in Mühlhausen, before his second appointment at the court in Weimar in 1708 as concertmaster and organist, where he remained until 1717.

During the period before his return to Weimar, Bach had composed a set of 31 chorale preludes: these were discovered independently by Christoph Wolff and Wilhelm Krunbach in the library of Yale University in the mid-1980s and first published as Das Arnstadter Orgelbuch. They form part of a larger collection of organ music compiled in the 1790s by the organist Johann Gottfried Neumeister (1756–1840) and are now referred to as the Neumeister Chorales BWV 1090–1120. These chorale preludes are all short, either in variation form or fughettas. Only a few other organ works based on chorales can be dated with any certainty to this period. These include the chorale partitas BWV 766-768 and 770, all sets of variations on a given chorale.

During his time as organist at Arnstadt, Bach was upbraided in 1706 by the Arnstadt Consistory "for having hitherto introduced sundry curious embellishments in the chorales and mingled many strange notes in them, with the result that the congregation has been confused." The type of chorale prelude to which this refers, often called the "Arnstadt type", were used to accompany the congregation with modulating improvisatory sections between the verses: examples that are presumed to be of this form include BWV 715, 722, 726, 729, 732 and 738. The earliest surviving autograph manuscript of a chorale prelude is BWV 739, Wie schön leuchtet der Morgenstern, based on an Epiphany hymn. It dates from 1705 and possibly was prepared for Bach's visit to Lübeck.

Purpose

Compositional style
Although there are a few important departures, the chorale preludes of the Orgelbüchlein were composed with a number of common stylistic features, which characterise and distinguish the so-called "Orgelbüchlein style:"

They are harmonisations of a cantus firmus which is taken by the soprano voice.
They are in four parts, with three accompanying voices.
The harmonies are filled out in the accompanying voices by motifs or figures derived from the cantus and written imitatively.
They begin directly with the cantus, either with or without accompaniment.
There are no breaks between the lines of the cantus for ritornellos or interludes in the accompanying voices.
The notes ending verse lines in the cantus are marked by fermata (pauses).

Exceptions include:

 BWV 611, where the cantus is in the alto voice
 BWV 600, 608, 618, 619, 620, 624, 629 and 633/634 where the soprano cantus is in canon with another voice.
 BWV 615, In dir ist Freude, where the cantus is heard in canon in all the voices over the accompanying motifs.
 BWV 599, Nun komm, der Heiden Heiland, and BWV 619, Christe du Lamm Gottes,  which are written for five voices.
 BWV 639, Ich ruf' zu dir, Herr Jesu Christ, which is written for three voices.
 BWV 617, 618, 619 and 637, where the accompaniment starts before the cantus.

Chorale Preludes BWV 599–644

Advent BWV 599–602

 BWV 599 Nun komm, der Heiden Heiland [Come now Saviour of heathens] 

Below is the first verse of Luther's advent hymn "Nun komm, der Heiden Heiland" with the translation in English of George MacDonald.

Although it has often been suggested that this opening advent chorale prelude resembles a French overture, in construction, with its texture of arpeggiated chords, it is more similar to the baroque keyboard preludes of German and French masters, such as Couperin. The accompanying motif in the lower three or sometimes four parts is derived from a suspirans in the melodic line, formed of a semiquaver (16th note) rest—a "breath"—followed by three semiquavers and a longer fourth note. Some commentators have seen this falling figure as representing a descent to earth, but it could equally well reflect a repetition of the words "Nun komm" in the text. The suspirans is made up of intervals of a rising second, a falling fourth following by yet another rising second. It is derived from the first line of the melody of the cantus firmus and often shared out freely between voices in the accompaniment. The mystery of the coming of the Saviour is reflected by the somewhat hidden cantus firmus, over  harmonies constantly reinventing themselves. It is less predictable and regular than other settings of the same hymn by Bach or predecessors like Buxtehude, only the second and third lines having any regularity.  The last line repeats the first but with the suspirans suppressed and the dotted rhythms of the bass replaced by a long pedal note, possibly reflecting the wonder described in the third and fourth lines of the first verse.

 BWV 600 Gott, durch deine Güte [God, through your goodness] (or Gottes Sohn ist kommen [The Son of God is come])

Below is the first of three verses of Johann Spannenberg's advent hymn with the translation in English of Charles Sanford Terry.

It is set to the same melody as Johann Roh's advent hymn Gottes Sohn ist kommen, the first verse of which is given here with the English translation of Catherine Winkworth.

This chorale prelude is a canon at the octave in the soprano and tenor voices, with the tenor entering one bar after the soprano. The stops for the canonic parts were explicitly marked by Bach in the autograph score, with the high tenor part in the pedal, written at the pitch Bach intended and also within the compass of the Weimar organ. Bach left no indication that the manualiter parts were to be played on two keyboards: indeed, as  points out, the autograph score brackets all the keyboard parts together; in addition technically at certain points the keyboard parts have to be shared between the two hands. The accompaniment is a skillful and harmonious moto perpetuo in the alto and bass keyboard parts with flowing quavers (eighth notes) in the alto, derived from the first four quaver suspirans figure, played above a walking bass in detached crotchets (quarter notes). The hymn was originally written in duple time but, to facilitate the canonic counterpoint, Bach adopted triple time with a minim beat, at half the speed of the bass. The bass accompaniment at first is derived directly from the melody; during the pauses in the soprano part, a second motif recurs. In the words of Albert Riemenschneider, "the exuberance of the passage work indicates a joyous background."

 BWV 601 Herr Christ, der einge Gottes-Sohn [Lord Christ, the only Son of God] (or Herr Gott, nun sei gepreiset [Lord God, now be praised])

 

Below are the first and last verses of Elisabeth Cruciger's hymn for Epiphany Herr Christ, der einig Gotts Sohn with the English translation of Myles Coverdale.

The same melody was used in the postprandial grace Herr Gott,  nun sei gepreiset, the first verse of which is given below with the English translation of Charles Sanford Terry.

Already it shows with beguiling simplicity all the features typical of the Orgelbüchlein preludes. The cantus firmus is presented unadorned in the soprano line with the other three voices on the same keyboard and in the pedal. The accompaniment is derived from the suspirans pedal motif of three semiquavers (16th notes) followed by two quavers (eighth notes). For  this particular motif signified "beatific joy", representing either "intimate gladness or blissful adoration." Although the chorale prelude cannot be precisely matched to the words of either hymn, the mood expressed is in keeping both with joy for the coming of Christ and gratitude for the bountifulness of God. The motif, which is anticipated and echoed in the seamlessly interwoven inner parts, was already common in chorale preludes of the period. Easy to play with alternating feet, it figured in particular in the preludes of Buxtehude and Böhm as well as an earlier manualiter setting of the same hymn by Bach's cousin, Johann Gottfried Walther. Bach, however, goes beyond the previous models, creating a unique texture in the accompaniment which accelerates, particularly in the pedal, towards the cadences. Already in the opening bar, as  points out, the subtlety of Bach's compositional skills are apparent. The alto part anticipates the pedal motif and, with it and the later dotted figure, echos the melody in the soprano. This type of writing—in this case with hidden and understated imitation between the voices, almost in canon, conveying a mood of intimacy—was a new feature introduced by Bach in his Orgelbüchlein.

 BWV 602 Lob sei dem allmächtigen Gott  [Praise be to God Almighty]

Below are the first two verses of Michael Weisse's advent hymn with the English translation of John Gambold.

The cantus firmus for this chorale prelude originates in the Gregorian chant  Conditor alme siderum. Although in the phrygian mode, Bach slightly modifies it, replacing  some B♭s by B♮s in the melody, but still ends in the key of A. The accompaniment is composed of two motifs, both suspirans: one in the inner parts contains a joy motif; and the other, shared between all three lower parts, is formed of three semiquavers (16th notes) and a longer note or just four semiquavers. In the pedal part this prominent descending motif has been taken to symbolise the "coming down of divine Majesty." Some commentators have suggested that the motion of the inner parts in parallel thirds or sixths might represent the Father and Son in the hymn. Albert Riemenschneider described the lower voices as creating "an atmosphere of dignified praise."

Christmas BWV 603–612
 BWV 603 Puer natus in Bethlehem [A boy is born in Bethlehem]

Below is the first verse of the traditional Latin carol Puer natus in Bethlehem with the English translation of Hamilton Montgomerie MacGill.

The cantus firmus in the soprano voice of this chorale prelude is a slight variant of the treble part of a four-part
setting of Puer natus by Lossius. The chorale prelude is in four parts for single manual and pedals. It is unusual in that in most published versions no repeats are marked. However, in the autograph score there are markings by Bach at the end of the score which might indicate that a repeat of the whole prelude was envisaged with first and second time versions for the last bar. Some recent editions have incorporated this suggestion. The two inner voices and pedal follow the usual Orgelbüchlein pattern, providing a harmonious accompaniment, with gently rocking quavers in the inner voices and a repeated motif in the pedal, rising first and then descending in crotchet steps. Various commentators have proposed interpretations of the accompanying motifs: the rocking motif to  suggest the action of swaddling; and the pedal motif as symbolising either the "journey of the Magi" to Bethlehem or Christ's "descent to earth". On a purely musical level, a mood of increasing wonder is created as the accompaniment intensifies throughout the chorale with more imitative entries in the inner parts.

 BWV 604 Gelobet seist du, Jesu Christ [Praised be you, Jesus Christ] a 2 Clav. et Ped.

Below is the first verse of Martin Luther's version "Gelobet seist du, Jesu Christ" (1524) of the traditional Christmas hymn Gratis nunc omnes reddamus, with the English translation of Myles Coverdale.

Bach used the same hymn in other organ compositions as well as in the cantatas BWV 64, 91 and 248, parts I and III (the Christmas Oratorio). The chorale prelude is scored for two manuals and pedal, with the cantus firmus in the soprano voice on the upper manual.  On the lower manual the two inner voices provide the harmonic accompaniment, moving stepwise in alternating semiquavers. The pedal part responds throughout with a constantly varying motif involving octave semiquaver leaps. The chorale prelude is in the mixolydian mode. Combined with the unadorned but singing melody and its gentle accompaniment, this produces a mood of tenderness and rapture.

 BWV 605 Der Tag, der ist so freudenreich [The day is so full of joy] a 2 Clav. et Ped.

Below is the German version of the Christmas hymn Dies est latitiae  with the English translation by Charles Sanford Terry.

The melody, medieval in origin, was published with the text in 1529. Apart from BWV 606, Bach composed a harmonisation of the hymn in BWV 294 and set it as a chorale prelude, BWV 719 in the Neumeister Collection. The chorale prelude BWV 605 is written for two manuals and pedal with the cantus firmus in the soprano part. The frequent F♮s are a hint of the mixolydian mode. The accompanying motif is shared between the two inner voices on the second manual which together provide a continuous stream of semiquavers with two hemidemiquavers on the second semiquaver of each group. The pedal provides a rhythmic pulse with a semiquaver walking bass with sustained notes at each cadence.  suggests that the relative simplicity of BWV 605 and the uniformity of the accompaniment could be signs that it was one of the earliest composed pieces in Orgelbüchlein. Dissonances in the pedal in bars 3 and 5, however, could also be signs of Bach's more mature style. Ernst Arfken and Siegfried Vogelsänger have interpreted some of the dissonant F♮s as references to elements of foreboding in the text (for example Ei du süsser Jesu Christ in the second verse). Many commentators have agreed with  that the lively and rhythmic accompaniment conveys "Christmas joy".

 BWV 606 Vom Himmel hoch, da komm ich her [From Heaven on high I come here]

Below are the first, second and last verses of the Christmas hymn Vom Himmel hoch, da komm ich her by Martin Luther with the English translation of Catherine Winkworth.

 The melody of Vom Himmel hoch was published in 1539. The hymn was performed throughout the Christmas period, particularly during nativity plays. Many composers set it to music for both chorus and organ: closest to Bach's time, Pachelbel and Johann Walther wrote chorale preludes. Bach's use of the hymn in his choral works includes the Magnificat, BWV 243 and 3 settings in the Christmas Oratorio, BWV 248. Apart from BWV 606, his organ settings include the early chorale preludes BWV 701 and 702 from the Kirnberger Collection and BWV 738 from the Neumeister Collection; the five Canonic Variations, BWV 769 were composed towards the end of his life.

The chorale prelude BWV 606 is written for single manual and pedal with the cantus firmus in the soprano part. As in all his other organ settings, Bach changed the rhythmic structure of the melody by drawing out the initial upbeats to long notes. This contrasts with Bach's choral settings and the chorale preludes of Pachelbel and Walther, which follow the natural rhythm of the hymn. In BWV 606, the rhythm is further obscured by the cadences of the second and final lines falling on the third beat of the bar. The accompaniment on the keyboard is built from semiquaver motifs, made up of four-note groups of suspirans semiquavers (starting with a rest or "breath").  These include turning figures and ascending or descending scales all presented in the first bar. The semiquaver figures, sometimes in parallel thirds or sixths, run continuously throughout the upper parts, including the soprano part, further obscuring the melody.  Below the upper voices, there is a striding pedal part in quavers with alternate footing. In the two closing bars, there is a fleeting appearance of figures usually associated with crucifixion chorales, such as Da Jesu an dem Kreuzer stund, BWV 621: semiquaver cross motifs in the upper parts above delayed or dragging entries in the pedal.

The predominant mood of the chorale prelude is one of joyous exultation. The semiquaver motifs, in constant motion upwards and downwards, create what  called "a charming maze," symbolising angels heralding the birth of Christ.
express this through musical means."

 BWV 607 Vom Himmel kam der Engel Schar [From Heaven came the host of angels]

Below are the first and fourth verses of Martin Luther's Christmas hymn Vom Himmel kam der Engel Schar with the English translation of Catherine Winkworth. 

The cantus firmus of this chorale prelude is in the soprano voice and is drawn from the tenor part of the four-part setting of Puer natus by Lossius. It is the only time Bach that used this hymn tune. Although there is some ambiguity in the autograph manuscript, the crossing of parts suggests that the intended scoring is for single manual and pedals. The motifs in the intricately crafted accompaniment are descending and ascending scales, sometimes in contrary motion, with rapid semiquaver scales shared between the inner voices and slower crotchet scales in the walking bass of the pedal part following each phrase of the melody. The mood of the chorale prelude is "ethereal" and "scintillating", veering elusively between the contemplative harmonised melody and the transitory rushing scales: towards the close the scales in the inner voices envelope the melody.

 BWV 608 In dulci jubilo  [In sweet joy]

Below is the traditional fourteenth century German/Latin Christmas carol In dulci jubilo with the English/Latin translation of Robert Lucas de Pearsall.

This chorale prelude is based on a traditional Christmas carol in canon that predates Luther. Prior to Bach, there had been settings of the carol as a canon by Fridolin Sicher and Johann Walther for organ and by Michael Praetorius for choir. Bach's chorale prelude is written for single manual and pedals, with the leading voice in the soprano. The canon—normally in the tenor part in the carol—is taken up one bar later in the pedal. As was Bach's custom, it was notated in the autograph manuscript at the pitch at which it should sound, although this fell outside the range of baroque pedalboards. The desired effect was achieved by using a 4′ pedal stop, playing the pedals an octave lower. The two accompanying inner voices, based on a descending triplet motif, are also in canon at the octave: such a double canon is unique amongst Bach's organ chorales. Following baroque convention, Bach notated the triplets in the accompaniment as quavers instead of crotchets, to make the score more readable for the organist. The accompaniment also has repeated crotchets on the single note of A, which, combined with the A's in the main canon, simulate the drone of a musette sounding constantly through the chorale until the A in bar 25. At that point the strict canon in the accompaniment stops, but the imitative triplet motif continues until the close, also passing effortlessly into the soprano part. Over the final pedal point, it sounds in all three of the upper voices. There is some ambiguity as to whether Bach intended the crotchets in the accompanying motif to be played as a dotted rhythm in time with the triplets or as two beats against three. The deliberate difference in spacing in the autograph score and the intended drone-like effect might suggest adopting the second solution throughout, although modern editions often contain a combination of the two.

The piping triplets above the musette drone create a gentle pastoral mood, in keeping with the subject of the carol. For  the constant sounding of A major chords, gently embellished by the accompaniment, suggest unequivocally the festive spirit of the dulci and jubilo in the title;  already described the accompanying triplets as representing a "direct and naive joy." Williams further suggests that the F♯ major chord at bar 25 might be a reference to leuchtet als die Sonne ("shines like the sun") in the first verse; and the long pedal point at the close to Alpha es et Omega ("You are the Alpha and the Omega") at the end of the first verse. The mood also reflects the first two lines of the third verse, "O love of the father, O gentleness of the newborn!" Bach often used canons in his chorale preludes to signify the relation between "leader" and "follower" as in his settings of Dies sind die heil'gen zehn Gebot ("These are the Ten Commandments");  considers that this was unlikely to be the case here, despite the words Trahe me post te ("Draw me to thee") in the second verse.

 BWV 609 Lobt Gott, ihr Christen, allzugleich [Praise God, you Christians all together]

Below are the first and last verses of Nikolaus Herman's Christmas hymn with the English translation by Arthur Tozer Russell.

The melody first appeared with this text in a 1580 hymnbook. Prior to Bach, there were choral settings by Michael Praetorius and Samuel Scheidt and a setting for organ in the choral prelude BuxWV 202 by Dieterich Buxtehude. Apart from BWV 609, Bach set the hymn in the cantatas BWV 151 and 195, the two harmonisations BWV 375 and 376 and the chorale prelude BWV 732. The chorale prelude BWV 609 is scored for single manual and pedal with the cantus firmus unembellished in the soprano voice. The accompaniment in the inner voices is a uniform stream of semiquavers shared between the parts, often in parallel sixths but occasionally in contrary motion. It is built up from several four-note semiquaver motifs first heard in the opening bars. Beneath them in the pedal is a contrasting walking bass in quavers with sustained notes at the end of each phrase. Unlike the inner voices, the pedal part has a wide range: there are two scale-like passages where it rises dramatically through two octaves, covering all the notes from the lowest D to the highest D. The four voices together convey a mood of joyous exultation.  speculates that the passages ascending through all the notes of the pedalboard might symbolise the word allzugleich ("all together"); and  suggest that the widening intervals at the start between the cantus and the descending pedal part might symbolise the opening up of the heavens (schließt auf sein Himmelreich).

 BWV 610 Jesu, meine Freude [Jesus, my joy]

Below are the first two verses of Johann Frank's hymn Jesu, meine Freude with the English translation by Catherine Winkworth.

The melody was first published with the text in Johann Crüger's hymnal Praxis pietatis melica of 1653. In later hymnbooks the hymn became associated with Christmas and Epiphany; it was also frequently included amongst the so-called Jesuslieder, devotional hymns addressed to Jesus, often for private use. One of the earliest settings of the hymn was Dieterich Buxtehude's cantata BuxWV 60 for four voices, strings and continuo, composed in the 1680s. Bach's friend and colleague Johann Walther composed an organ partita on the hymn in 1712. Apart from BWV 610, Bach's organ settings include the chorale preludes BWV 713 in the Kirnberger Collection, BWV 1105 in the Neumeister Collection and BWV 753 composed in 1720. Amongst his choral settings are the harmonisation BWV 358, the motet BWV 227 for unaccompanied choir and cantatas BWV 12, 64, 81 and 87.

The chorale prelude BWV 610 is scored for single manual and pedal, with the cantus firmus unadorned in the soprano voice. Marked Largo, the cantus and accompanying voices in the two inner parts and pedal are written at an unusually low pitch, creating a sombre effect. The accompaniment is based on semiquaver motifs first heard in their entirety in the pedal in bar one; the inner parts often move in parallel thirds followed by quasi-ostinato responses in the pedal. The rich and complex harmonic structure is partly created by dissonances arising from suspensions and occasional chromaticisms in the densely scored accompanying voices: the motifs are skillfully developed but with restraint.

Both  and  concur with the assessment of  that "fervent longing (sehnsuchtsvoll Innigkeit) is marked in every line of the exquisite labyrinth of music in which the master has involved one of his favourite melodies." As  has pointed out, when composing this chorale prelude Bach might have had in mind one of the alternative more intimate texts for the melody such as Jesu, meine Freude, wird gebohren heute, available in contemporary Weimar hymnbooks and reprinted later in Schemellis Gesangbuch of 1736.

 BWV 611 Christum wir sollen loben schon [We should indeed praise Christ] Choral in Alto

Below is the first verse of Martin Luther's hymn Christum wir sollen loben schon with the English translation of Richard Massie (1854). Luther's text was his version of the Latin hymn A solis ortus cardine, part of the fifth century abecedarius of Coelius Sedulius; it has been inserted between the two. Another extract from Sedulius' poem became the Latin Hymn Hostis herodes impie. The first verse is given below with Luther's German version Was fürchtst du, Feind Herodes, sehr to the same melody. Both verses concern Christ's coming on earth.

The melody of the cantus firmus in the Dorian mode is based on the Latin hymn A solis ortus cardine, which appeared in its Lutheran version in 1524. It was used in settings by Scheidt, Scheidemann, Walther and de Grigny, the latter two employing the Latin title. Apart from BWV 611, Bach set the hymn earlier in BWV 696, a chorale prelude from the Kirnberger Collection, and later in his cantata Christum wir sollen loben schon, BWV 121.

BWV 611, marked Adagio, has several unusual and novel features. In contrast to the densely scored chorale prelude BWV 610, the four parts—augmented to five by the double pedal in the last two bars—are widely spaced employing the full range of the baroque organ. Apart from chorale preludes that are canons, this is the unique Orgelbüchlein prelude where the cantus firmus is in the "middle"  alto voice. Scored for single manual and pedal, the accompanying voices are the soprano (right hand), the tenor (left hand) and the bass (pedal). The cantus firmus alto part is in a dotted rhythm shared between the two hands, as if hidden. The accompanying motif derives from a suspirans figure, a four note descending or ascending semiquaver scale starting off the beat; this flowing motif is possibly derived from the hymn melody, moving as it does in steps, albeit much slower. The motif is first heard high up in the soprano voice which is placed in bare relief by the sustained notes and slow-moving melody in the lower parts. In particular the pedal point in the first note of the bass heightens the dramatic effect of the opening by briefly abandoning the usual motivic Orgelbüchlein pattern. After the opening, the four note motif is extended throughout in the bass part to five notes by preceding it by a dotted quaver: the slow tempo facilitates semiquaver scales in the pedal. In the sixth bar the soprano and the bass play the highest and lowest notes in the Weimar organ's register, the two C's above and below middle C. The Bach scholar Hermann Keller has described the resulting musical texture as the most ethereal in the Orgelbüchlein. The "hidden" alto hymn tune, occasionally tinged with chromaticism, imparts a further sense of mystery. Above and below it the scale figures in the three accompanying parts are heard meandering in parallel and sometimes contrary motion. In the eleventh bar the bass's motivic accompaniment pauses for a second pedal point after which it resumes by unexpectedly taking up the cantus firmus in canon—two beats after and two octaves below the alto—until the end of the twelfth bar. At the same time in the eleventh bar the soprano and tenor parts play semiquaver motives in canon separated by a quaver and two octaves, before playing in more transparent imitation in bars 12 and 13. After the cadence at bar 14 from D minor to A minor, the accompaniment is augmented to four voices with a second voice in the pedal, first with motivic semiquaver figures in all the parts in the penultimate bar; and then imitative dactylic joy motifs in the soprano and tenor parts during the closing bar.

There is a precursor of the musical style of BWV 611—the plainchant melody A solis ortus cardine/Hostis herodes impie accompanied by polyphonic scale motifs—in the 1667 Deuxième Livre d’Orgue of Nivers.

Commentators have suggested how the musical form echos the themes of the hymn—the cantus firmus reflecting  the mystery of the incarnation, Christ hidden in Mary's womb, and its chromaticism the purity of the virgin.  The widely spaced polyphonic texture has been taken as a musical depiction of Sedulius' poetic lines A solis ortus cardine, ad usque terræ limitem—"From the hinge of the rising sun, To the farthest edge of the earth". For  the opening motivic accompaniment "entwines the chorale melody in a consummately effective way and embraces a whole world of unutterable joy", the adagio is a "mystical contemplation", and the motifs "a joyous exaltation in the soprano".

 BWV 612 Wir Christenleut [We Christians]

Below are the first and third verses of the hymn of Caspar Fuger with the English translation of Catherine Winkworth first published in 1592 with the melody, which predates it.

The hymn was previously set as the chorale prelude BWV 710 in the Kirnberger Collection; and it also appears as BWV 1090 in the Neumeister Collection. The autograph manuscript of Orgelbüchlein contains the original composing score for BWV 612. As with the most of the collection, Bach had allotted one page for the chorale prelude. Due to lack of space, he entered the final two and a half bars in more compact tablature notation. The dots indicating the second half could be repeated—an unusual feature in Orgelbüchlein—first appeared in print in the 1983 Neue Bach-Gesellschaft edition of Heinz-Harald Löhlein.

BWV 612 is written for single manual and pedal with four voices. The plain cantus firmus is in the soprano part. The accompaniment—striding quavers in the pedal like an ostinato bass and dance-like semiquavers in the inner parts—s formed from two short motifs. Both motifs are related as can be seen when they are first heard together in the alto and bass parts in the last two beats of bar 1 and first beats of bar 2: separated by an octave plus a third, the bass motif (a rest followed by six notes) can be seen as a simplified form of the alto motif (a rest followed by two five-note figures). At the same time the motif in the inner parts is derived from descending scale D, C, B-flat, A that recurs in the cantus. Both accompanying  motifs serve to propel the chorale prelude forwards, the bass line having a similar function to that in the last movement of the fourth Brandenburg concerto. Although the cantus itself repeats more of its lines than most Lutheran hymns, Bach avoids repetitiveness in the chorale prelude by varying the harmonies and rhythmic texture in the accompaniment for each phrase. In addition what sounds like an interlude for alto and tenor during a two and a half bar rest in the pedal part creates further variety.

The same type of bass line was used much later by Bach in the chorale prelude Wir glauben all an einen Gott”, BWV 664 in Clavier-Übung III.

New Year BWV 613–615
 BWV 613 Helft mir Gotts Güte preisen [Help me to praise God's goodness]

Below is the first verse of this New Year's hymn of Paul Eber with the English translation by John Christian Jacobi.

 BWV 614 Das alte Jahr vergangen ist [The old year has passed] a 2 Clav. et Ped.

Below are the six verses of this New Year's hymn with the English translation of Catherine Winkworth.

 

Customarily sung on New Year's Day, the hymn addresses thanks for the past year and prayers for the coming year to Christ. Although primarily a supplication looking forwards to the future, the hymn also looks back at the past, reflecting on the perils facing man, his sins and his transitory existence.

The version of the hymn that Bach used for BWV 614 only emerged gradually. The first two verses of the hymn text were first published in Clemens Stephani's Nuremberg hymnbook of 1568; the entire six verses of the text appeared in Johann Steuerlein's Erfurt hymnbook of 1588. An early version of the melody also appeared in Steuerlein's hymnbook, but set to different words (Gott Vater, der du deine Sonn). That melody first appeared with the text in Erhard Bodenschatz's Leipzig hymnbook of 1608. One of the earliest known sources for the version of the hymn used by Bach is Gottfried Vopelius's Leipzig hymnbook of 1682. Prior to modern scientific methods for dating Bach's autograph manuscripts, scholars had relied on identifying hymnbooks available to him to determine exactly when Orgelbüchlein was written.  erroneously assigned a date after 1715, because the earliest source for Das alte Jahr he had been able to locate was Christian Friedrich Witt's Gotha hymnbook, first published in 1715. As is now known,  Bach set Das alte Jahr early in his career as BWV 1091, one of the chorale preludes in the Neumeister Collection; he also composed two four-part harmonisations, BWV 288 and 289.

The chorale prelude BWV 614 is written for two manuals and pedal with the cantus firmus in the soprano voice. Despite starting starkly with two repeated crotchets—unaccompanied and unembellished—in the cantus, BWV 614 is an ornamental chorale prelude: the highly expressive melodic line, although restrained, includes elaborate ornamentation, coloratura melismas (reminiscent of Bach's Arnstadt chorale preludes) and "sighing" falling notes, which at the close completely subsume the melody as they rise and fall in the final cadence. The accompaniment is built from the motif of a rising chromatic fourth heard first in the response to the first two notes of the cantus. The motif is in turn linked to the melodic line, which later on in bar 5 is decorated with a rising chromatic fourth. Bach ingeniously develops the accompaniment using the motif in canon, inversion and semiquaver stretto. The three lower voices respond to each other and to the melodic line, with the soprano and alto voices sighing in parallel sixths at the close. The chromatic fourth was a common form of the baroque passus duriusculus, mentioned in the seventeenth century musical treatise of Christoph Bernhard, a student of Heinrich Schütz. The chromaticism creates ambiguities of key throughout the chorale prelude. The original hymn melody is in the aeolian mode of A (the natural form of A minor) modulating to E major in the final cadence.  analyses the mysteries of the key structure in BWV 614. In addition to giving a detailed Schenkerian analysis, he notes that the cadences pass between D minor and A until the final cadence to E major; that the modal structure moves between the Dorian mode on D and the Phrygian mode on E through the intermediary of their common reciting note A; and that the key changes are mediated by the chromatic fourths in the accompaniment.

Since the nineteenth century successive commentators have found the mood of the chorale prelude to be predominantly sad, despite that not being in keeping with the hymn text. The chromatic fourth has been interpreted as a "grief motif". To Renwick such "cyclicity" reflects the themes of the hymn: "a turning point; a Janus-like reflection backward and forward; regret for the past and hope for the future; the place between before and after."
  

BWV 615 In dir ist Freude [In you is joy]

 

Below is the first verse of the hymn In dir ist Freude with the English translation by Catherine Winkworth.

The church musician Johann Lindemann published the text in 1598 and Giovanni Giacomo Gastoldi supplied the melody in 1591.

Candlemas BWV 616–617
 BWV 616 Mit Fried' und Freud' ich fahr' dahin [With peace and joy I depart]

Below is the first verse of Martin Luther's version of the Nunc dimittis,  Mit Fried und Freud ich fahr dahin, a text associated with the Epiphany-tide feast of the Presentation in the Temple, together with an English translation by Catherine Winkworth.

 BWV 617 Herr Gott, nun schleuß den Himmel auf [Lord God, now unlock Heaven]

Below are the first and last verses of Tobias Kiel's hymn which references the Song of Simeon, a biblical text associated with the Epiphany-tide feast of the Presentation in the Temple. The English translation is by Catherine Winkworth.

Lent BWV 618–624

 BWV 618 O Lamm Gottes, unschuldig [Oh innocent Lamb of God] Canon alla Quinta

Below is the first verse and refrain of the third verse of this version of the Agnus Dei,  O Lamm Gottes, unschuldig, with the English translation of Catherine Winkworth.

 BWV 619 Christe, du Lamm Gottes [Christ, Lamb of God] in Canone alla Duodecime,  a 2 Clav. et Ped.

Below is the first verse and refrain of the third verse of Christe, du Lamm Gottes, a German version of the Agnus Dei, with the English translation of Charles Sanford Terry.

 BWV 620 Christus, der uns selig macht [Christ, who makes us blessed] in Canone all'Ottava

This setting of the Lutheran hymn Christus, der uns selig macht features the chorale in canon between the highest voice in the manuals and the pedal part. The original manuscript features passages in tablature notation, which has led to inaccurate readings in some published editions.

Below is the text of the first and last verse of the Passiontide hymn with the English translation of John Christian Jacobi.

{|
|-
|
Christus, der uns selig macht,
kein Bös hat gegangen,
war für uns zur Mitternacht
als ein dieb gefangen,
geführt vor Gottlose Leut
und fälschlich verklaget,
verlacht, verhöhnt under verspeit,
wie den Schrift saget.
•••
O hilf, Christe, Gottes Sohn,
durch dein bitter Leiden,
daß wir dir stets untertan
Sünd und Unrecht meiden,
deinen Tod und sein Ursach
fruchtbar nun bedenken,
dafür, wiewohl arm und schwach,
dir Dankopfer schenken.
|
Christ, by Whose all-saving Light
Mankind benefited,
Was for Sinners in the Night
As a Thief committed.
Dragged before a wicked Court
Of the Jewish Clergy;
Where they tried their worst Effort
Gainst the Lord of Mercy.•••Grant, O Jesu, blessed Lord,By Thy Cross and Passion,Thy blest Love may be adoredBy the whole Creation:Hating Sin, the woful CauseOf Thy Death and Suffering,Give our Heart to obey Thy LawsAs the best Thanks-offering.|
|}

 BWV 621 Da Jesus an dem Kreuze stund [As Jesus hung upon the Cross]

Below is the text by Johann Böschenstein (1472–1540) of the first and last verses of this Passiontide hymn Da Jesus an dem Kreuze stund with the English translation from the Moravian Hymn Book (1746). Usually sung on Good Friday, the hymn has as its theme the Seven Last Words from the Cross, each of the seven intervening verses meditating on a different Word.

The hymn melody is in the phrygian mode and dates back to the Reformation. In the generation prior to Bach, organ settings had mainly been made by composers in Southern Germany like Kindermann, Pachelbel and Fischer.

Unlike most of the other chorale preludes in the Orgelbüchlein, Bach did not use the chorale in any of his cantatas—BWV 621 is his unique setting of the hymn. BWV 621 is scored for single manual and pedal, with the cantus firmus in the soprano voice almost entirely in plain crotchets. The accompaniment below the cantus creates an unusually dense texture. There are three accompanying voices, often closely scored: the alto and tenor voices in the keyboard between them weave a continuous and complex pattern of rising and falling semiquavers, sometimes in parallel thirds; and below them the bass voice in the pedal moves in steady quavers and syncopated crotchets.

The accompaniment in each lower voice is constructed from its own separate motifs, each having its own characteristic rhythm. Although the longer figures in the two lowest voices are heard several times throughout the piece, Bach's ingenious writing gives no sense of artifice or mechanical repetition. In addition, as  notes, the outer and inner voices are naturally paired: the pedal with—or in opposition to—the cantus; and the alto voice with the tenor. The pedal starts off with a cross motif in quavers, which recurs throughout the composition. The  cross motifs are followed  by suspended crochets, falling in steps. These create constant dissonances with the cantus which are resolved only by the cadence at the close. The syncopated crotchets in the pedal also interrupt the fermatas at the end of each cantus line, giving a further sense of restlessness. The alto part is characterised by falling anapaests; while the tenor line is made up of two parts, the first a rising semiquaver figure and the second shorter semiquaver cross motifs descending in sequence. As the piece progresses the motifs become more concentrated, with the alto taking up some of the tenor motifs towards the close. These novel features mark a departure from the more standard settings of the hymn by Bach's predecessors such as Fischer which conform more closely to the stile antico.

Many commentators have interpreted the compositional form and motifs of BWV 621 in terms of the themes of the Passiontide hymn, primarily concerned with the crucifixion.  wrote that Christ's hanging on the cross "is represented by the heavy, syncopated notes" and takes this as "evidence 
of a wonderfully true aesthetic feeling" [in Bach], since "that enforced quietude of direst anguish was no real calm." For  the syncopated bass line is a "masterful" way of evoking the dragging of the cross. Similar motifs and handling of voices occur at the close of Von Himmel hoch, da komm ich her, BWV 606: although that Christmas hymn primarily concerns the incarnation of Christ, later parts of the text foreshadow the crucifixion.

 BWV 622 O Mensch, bewein dein Sünde groß [Oh Man, bewail your great sins] a 2 Clav. et Ped.

Below is the text of the first stanza of the hymn O Mensch, bewein dein Sünde groß by Sebald Heyden with the English translation of Catherine Winkworth.

"O Mensch" is one of the most celebrated of Bach's chorale preludes. The cantus firmus, composed in 1525 by Matthias Greitter and associated with Whitsuntide, was also later used with the same words for the closing chorale of the first part of the St Matthew Passion, taken from the 1725 version of the St John Passion. Bach ornamented the simple melody, in twelve phrases reflecting the twelve lines of the opening verse, with an elaborate coloratura. It recalls but also goes beyond the ornamental chorale preludes of Buxtehude. The ornamentation, although employing conventional musical figures, is highly original and inventive. While the melody in the upper voice is hidden by coloratura over a wide range, the two inner voices are simple and imitative above the continuo-style bass. Bach varies the texture and colouring of the accompaniment for each line of what is one of the longest melodies in the collection.

In the penultimate line, accompanying the words "ein schwere Bürd" (a heavy burden), the inner parts intensify moving in semiquavers (16th notes) with the upper voice to a climax on the highest note in the prelude. The closing phrase, with its mounting chromatic bass accompanying bare unadorned crotchets (quarter notes) in the melody to end in an unexpected modulation to C♭ major, recall but again go beyond earlier compositions of Pachelbel, Frohberger and Buxtehude. It has been taken by some commentators as a musical allusion to the words kreuze lange in the text: for Spitta the passage was "full of imagination and powerful feeling."  As  comments, however, the inner voices, "with their astonishing accented passing-notes transcend images, as does the sudden simplicity of the melody when the bass twice rises chromatically."

 BWV 623 Wir danken dir, Herr Jesu Christ [We give thanks to you, Lord Jesus Christ]

Below is the German text of the 1568 Lutheran hymn by the Bohemian theologian Christoph Fischer, with the English translation of Benjamin Hall Kennedy.

 BWV 624 Hilf, Gott, daß mir's gelinge [Help me, God, that I may succeed] a 2 Clav. et Ped.

Below is the text of the hymn from the Ballad of the Passion (1527) by Heinrich Müller with a 16th-century translation from The Gude and Godlie Ballatis.

Easter BWV 625–630
 BWV 625 Christ lag in Todesbanden [Christ lay in the bonds of death]

Below are the first and fourth verses of Martin Luther's Easter hymn Christ lag in Todesbanden with the English translation of Paul England.

BWV 625 is based on the hymn tune of Luther's "Christ lag in Todesbanden". The sharp on the second note was a more modern departure, already adopted by the composer-organists Bruhns, Böhm and Scheidt and by Bach himself in his early cantata Christ lag in Todes Banden, BWV 4. The chorale prelude is in four parts for single manual and pedals, with the cantus firmus in the soprano voice. It closely follows the four voices of Bach's earlier harmonisation in the four-part chorale BWV 278, with virtually no changes in the cantus firmus. The two accompanying inner parts and pedal are elaborated by a single motif of four or eight semiquavers descending in steps. It is derived from the final descending notes of the melody: 

The semiquaver motif runs continuously throughout the piece, passing from one lower voice to another. Commentators have given different interpretations of what the motif might symbolise: for  it was "the bonds of death" (Todesbanden) and for Hermann Keller "the rolling away of the stone". Some have also seen the suspensions between bars as representing "the bonds of death". These interpretations can depend on the presumed tempo of the chorale prelude. A very slow tempo was adopted by the school of late nineteenth and early twentieth century French organists, such as Guilmant and Dupré: for them the mood of the chorale prelude was quiet, inward-looking and mournful; Dupré even saw in the descending semiquavers "the descent by the holy women, step by step, to the tomb". At a faster tempo, as has become more common, the mood becomes more exultant and vigorous, with a climax at the words Gott loben und dankbar sein ("praise our God right heartily"), where the music becomes increasingly chromatic.  suggests that the motif might then resemble the Gewalt ("power") motif in the cello part of BWV 4, verse 3; and that the turmoil created by the rapidly changing harmonies in some bars might echo the word Krieg ("war") in verse 4.

 BWV 626 Jesus Christus, unser Heiland, der den Tod überwand [Jesus Christ, our Saviour, who conquered death]

Below is the first verse of Martin Luther's Easter hymn Jesus Christus, unser Heiland, der den Tod überwand with the English translation by George MacDonald.

 BWV 627 Christ ist erstanden [Christ is risen]

Below is the text of the three verses of the Easter hymn Christ ist erstanden with the English translation of Myles Coverdale.

 BWV 628 Erstanden ist der heil'ge Christ [The holy Christ is risen]

Below is the traditional Easter carol Surrexit Christus hodie in German and English translations.

 BWV 629 Erschienen ist der herrliche Tag [The glorious day has come] a 2 Clav. et Ped.

Below is the first verse of Nikolaus Herman's hymn Erschienen ist der herrlich Tag with the English translation of Arthur Russell.

 BWV 630 Heut triumphieret Gottes Sohn [Today the Son of God triumphs]

 

Below is the first verse of Caspar Stolshagen's Easter hymn Heut triumphieret Gottes Sohn by Bartholomäus Gesius with the English translation of George Ratcliffe Woodward.

Pentecost BWV 631–634
 BWV 631 Komm, Gott Schöpfer, Heiliger Geist  [Come God, Creator, Holy Ghost]

Below are the first and last verses of Martin Luther's hymn for Pentecost Komm, Gott Schöpfer, Heiliger Geist with the English translation of George MacDonald.

 BWV 632 Herr Jesu Christ, dich zu uns wend [Lord Jesus Christ, turn to us]

Below are the first and third verses of the Lutheran hymn Herr Jesu Christ, dich zu uns wend by Wilhelm, Duke of Saxe-Weimar (1648) with the English translation of John Christian Jacobi. Throughout Thuringia and Saxony this became the hymn that the congregation sang as the priest entered the pulpit before delivering his Sunday sermon.

Although, with its references to the Holy Spirit, the hymn has relevance to Pentecost, its customary use in Sunday services almost certainly prompted Bach to compose several settings (BWV 622, BWV 655, BWV 709, BWV 726 and BWV 749). Johann Gottfried Walther, Bach's distant cousin and the organist in the Stadtkirche in Weimar, also set the hymn as a chorale prelude and as a partita with many variations.

BWV 632 is written for single keyboard and pedal with the cantus firmus in the soprano part: it starts with a characteristic triad, at first concealed by the intermediate notes of the legato dotted rhythm. The same suspirans triad motif, like a broken chord or arpeggio, forms the basis of the accompaniment in the two inner voices: the imitative responses between the parts providing a steady flow of semiquaver figures, rising and falling, melifluous and sweet. More than a simple accompaniment, the push the harmonies forward, revealing it unexpectedly at every turn. Below them the pedal bass provides a distinctive accompaniment in quavers and crotchets, starting off with a quaver triad. Although largely moving in steps, like a walking bass, the pedal plays a type of canon two octaves below the cantus. The canon is itself disguised, in crotchets in the first half with the same rhythm as the soprano; but in the second half it is heard in fragmentary form at double the speed in quavers.

The accompanying arpeggio motifs in the inner parts are not dissimilar to figurations in settings of the hymn by Georg Böhm and Walther (the 6th variation in his partita). But the light and  airy texture of the keyboard writing has more in common with the harpsichord allemande, such as BuxWV 238/1 below, from the thirteenth keyboard suite of Dieterich Buxtehude: the introductory upbeat; the repeats of binary dance form; and the arpeggiated accompaniment at the cadences.

The reprise of the second part differs from the hymn as it appears in hymnbooks; but the stream of repeated triadic motifs—which  interpreted as constant repetitions of Herr Jesu Christ—add to the mood of supplication in the chorale prelude. Hermann Keller has suggested that Bach might have employed the canon as musical iconography for the plea to be "led" at the end of the first verse: und uns den Weg zu Wahrheit führ ("and lead us on the path of truth").

 BWV 633 Liebster Jesu, wir sind hier (distinctius) [Dearest Jesus, we are here] in Canone alla Quinta,  a 2 Clav. et Ped.

 BWV 634 Liebster Jesu, wir sind hier [Dearest Jesus, we are here] in Canone alla Quinta, a 2 Clav. et Ped.

Below is the first verse of Tobias Clausnitzer's Lutheran hymn Liebster Jesu, wir sind hier with the English translation of Catherine Winkworth.

Catechism hymns BWV 635–638
 BWV 635 Dies sind die heil'gen zehn Gebot [These are the ten commandments]

Below are the first and last two verses of the Lutheran catechism hymn Dies sind die heil'gen zehn Gebot (the Ten Commandments) with an English translation by George MacDonald.

 
The Lutheran Erfurter Enchiridion of 1524 contains the text with the melody, which was also used for In Gottes Nahmen fahren wir, a pilgrims' hymn. Bach wrote a four-part chorale on the hymn tune in BWV 298; he used it for the trumpet canon in the opening chorus of cantata BWV 77; and much later he set it for organ in the first two of the catechism chorale preludes, BWV 678 and 679, of Clavier-Übung III.

The chorale prelude BWV 635 is in the mixolydian mode with the cantus firmus in the soprano voice in simple minims. The accompaniment in the three lower voices is built up from two motifs each containing the repeated notes that characterise the theme. The first motif in quavers is a contracted version of the first line of the cantus (GGGGGGABC), first heard in the pedal bass in bars 1 and 2. It also occurs in inverted form. This emphatic hammering motif is passed imitatively between the lower voices as a form of canon.  The second motif, first heard in the alto part in bars 2 and 3, is made up of five groups of 4 semiquavers, individual groups being related by inversion (first and fifth) and reflection (second and third). The pivotal notes CCCDEF in this motif are also derived from the theme. The second motif is passed from voice to voice in the accompaniment—there are two passages where it is adapted to the pedal with widely spaced semiquavers alternating between the feet—providing an unbroken stream of semiquavers complementing the first motif.

The combined affekt of the four parts, with 25 repetitions of the quaver motif, is one of "confirming" the biblical laws chanted in the verses of the hymn. There is likewise a reference to "law" in the canon of the quaver motif. For  the motif had "an inherent organic connection with the chorale itself." Some commentators, aware that the number "ten" of the Ten Commandments has been detected in the two chorale preludes of Clavier-Übung III, have endeavoured to find a hidden numerology in BWV 635. The attempts of  have been criticised: Harvey Grace felt that Bach was "expressing the idea of insistence, order, dogma—anything but statistics."  points out, however, that if there is any intentional numerology, it might be in the occurrences of the strict form of the motif, with tone and semitone intervals matching the first entry: it occurs precisely ten times in the chorale prelude (b1 – bass; b1 – tenor; b2 – bass; b4 – bass; b9 – tenor; b10 – bass; b11 – tenor; b13 – tenor; b15 – alto; b18 – tenor).

 BWV 636 Vater unser im Himmelreich [Our Father who art in Heaven]

Below are the first and last verses of the Lutheran version of the Lord's Prayer with the English translation of George MacDonald.

Following the publication of the text and melody in 1539, the hymn was used in many choral and organ compositions.  Amongst Bach's immediate predecessors, Dieterich Buxtehude wrote two settings of the hymn for organ—a freely composed chorale prelude in three verses (BuxWV 207) and a chorale prelude for two manuals and pedal (BuxWV 219); and Georg Böhm composed a partita and two chorale preludes (previously misattributed to Bach as BWV 760 and 761). Bach himself harmonised the hymn in BWV 416, with a later variant in one of the chorales from the St John Passion. He used it in cantatas BWV 90, 100 and 102 with a different text. Amongst the early organ compositions on Vater unser attributed to Bach, only the chorale prelude BWV 737 has been ascribed with any certainty. After Orgelbüchlein, Bach returned to the hymn with a pair of chorale preludes (BWV 682 and 683) in Clavier-Übung III.

In the chorale prelude BWV 636 the plain cantus firmus is in the soprano voice. The accompaniment in the inner parts and pedal is based on a four-note semiquaver suspirans motif (i.e. preceded by a rest or "breath") and a longer eight-note version; both are derived from the first phrase of the melody. In turn Bach's slight alteration of the melody in bars 1 and 3 might have been dictated by his choice of motif. The two forms of the motif and their inversions pass from one lower voice to another, producing a continuous stream of semiquavers; semiquavers in one voice are accompanied by quavers in the other two. The combined effect is of the harmonisation of a chorale by arpeggiated chords. Hermann Keller even suggested that Bach might have composed the chorale prelude starting from an earlier harmonisation; as  points out, however, although the harmonic structure adheres to that of a four-part chorale, the pattern of semiquavers and suspended notes is different for each bar and always enhances the melody, sometimes in unexpected ways.  described the accompanying motifs as representing "peace of mind"(quiétude).

 BWV 637 Durch Adams Fall ist ganz verderbt [Through Adam's fall are wholly ruined]

Below are the first and seventh verses of the hymn written in 1524 by Lazarus Spengler with an English translation by John Christian Jacobi.

The penitential text, written in the Nuremberg of Hans Sachs and the Meistersingers where Spengler was town clerk, is concerned with "human misery and ruin," faith and redemption; it encapsulates some of the central tenets of the Lutheran Reformation. The melody, originally for a Reformation battle hymn of 1525, was first published with Spengler's text in 1535. Bach previously set it as a chorale prelude in the Kirnberger Collection (BWV 705) and Neumeister Collection (BWV 1101); the seventh verse also recurs in the closing chorales of cantatas BWV 18 and BWV 109. Dieterich Buxtehude had already set the hymn as a chorale prelude (BuxWV 183) prior to Bach.

The chorale prelude BWV 637 is one of the most original and imaginative in the Orgelbüchlein, with a wealth of motifs in the accompaniment. Scored for single manual and pedal, the unadorned cantus firmus is in the soprano voice. Beneath the melody in a combination of four different motifs, the inner parts wind sinuously in an uninterrupted line of semiquavers, moving chromatically in steps. Below them the pedal responds to the melodic line with downward leaps in diminished, major and minor sevenths, punctuated by rests. Bach's ingenious writing is constantly varying. The expressive mood is heightened by the fleeting modulations between minor and major keys; and by the dissonances between the melody and the chromatic inner parts and pedal. The abrupt leaps in the pedal part create unexpected changes in key; and halfway through the chorale prelude the tangled inner parts are inverted to produce an even stranger harmonic texture, resolved only in the final bars by the modulation into a major key.

The chorale prelude has generated numerous interpretations of its musical imagery, its relation to the text and to baroque affekt.  records that the dissonances might symbolise original sin, the downward leaps in the pedal the fall of Adam, and the modulations at the close hope and redemption;
the rests in the pedal part could be examples of the affekt that the seventeenth century philosopher Athanasius Kircher called "a sighing of the spirit."  points out that the diminished seventh interval used in the pedal part was customarily associated with "grief." The twisting inner parts have been interpreted as illustrating the words verderbt ("ruined") by Hermann Keller and Schlang ("serpent") by Jacques Chailley.  described the pedal part as "a series of almost irremediable stumbles"; in contrast Ernst Arfken saw the uninterrupted cantus firmus as representing constancy in faith. For Wolfgang Budday, Bach's departure from normal compositional convention was itself intended to symbolise the "corruption" and "depravity" of man.   also preferred to view Bach's chorale prelude as representing the complete text of the hymn instead of individual words, distinguishing it from Buxtehude's earlier precedent. Considered to be amongst his most expressive compositions—  describes it as "imbued with sorrow"—Buxtehude's setting employs explicit word-painting.

 BWV 638 Es ist das Heil uns kommen her [Salvation has come to us]

The first verse of the Lutheran hymn Es ist das Heil uns kommen her of Paul Speratus is given below with the English translation of John Christian Jacobi.

The text treats a central Lutheran theme—only faith in God is required for redemption. The melody is from an Easter hymn. Many composers had written organ settings prior to Bach, including  Sweelinck, Scheidt and Buxtehude (his chorale prelude BuxWV 186). After Orgelbüchlein, Bach set the entire hymn in cantata Es ist das Heil uns kommen her, BWV 9; and composed chorales on single verses for cantatas 86, 117, 155 and 186.

In the chorale prelude BWV 638 for single manual and pedal, the cantus firmus is in the soprano voice in simple crotchets. The accompaniment in the inner voices is built on a four-note motif—derived from the hymn tune—a descending semiquaver scale, starting with a rest or "breath" (suspirans): together they provide a constant stream of semiquavers, sometimes in parallel sixths, running throughout the piece until the final cadence. Below them the pedal is a walking bass in quavers, built on the inverted motif and octave leaps, pausing only to mark the cadences at the end of each line of the hymn. The combination of the four parts conveys a joyous mood, similar to that of BWV 606 and 609. For Hermann Keller, the running quavers and semiquavers "suffuse the setting with health and strength."  and  speculate that this chorale prelude and the preceding BWV 637, written on opposite sides of the same manuscript paper, might have been intended as a pair of contrasting catechism settings, one about sin, the other about salvation. Both have similar rhythmic structures in the parts, but one is in a minor key with complex chromatic harmonies, the other in a major key with firmly diatonic harmonies.

Miscellaneous BWV 639–644
 BWV 639 Ich ruf zu dir, Herr Jesu Christ [I call to you, Lord Jesus Christ] a 2 Clav. et Ped.

Below is the first verse of Johannes Agricola's hymn with the English translation of John Christian Jacobi.

"Ich ruf zu dir" is amongst the most popular chorale preludes in the collection. Pure in style, this ornamental chorale prelude has been described as "a supplication in time of despair." Written in the meantone key of F minor, it is the unique prelude in trio form with voices in the two manuals and the pedal. It is possible that the unusual choice of key followed Bach's experience playing the new organ at Halle which employed more modern tuning. The ornamented melody in crotchets (quarter notes) sings in the soprano above a flowing legato semiquaver (16th note) accompaniment and gently pulsating repeated quavers (eighth notes) in the pedal continuo.  Such viol-like semiquaver figures  in the middle voice already appeared as "imitatio violistica" in the Tabalutara nova (1624) of Samuel Scheidt. The instrumental combination itself was used elsewhere by Bach: in the third movement of the cantata Schmücke dich, o liebe Seele, BWV 180 for soprano, violoncello piccolo and continuo; and the 19th movement of the St John Passion, with the middle voice provided by semiquaver arpeggios on the lute.

A close variant of BWV 639 is catalogued as BWV Anh. 73, an expanded arrangement for organ, attributed to the composer's son C.P.E. Bach.

 BWV 640 In dich hab ich gehoffet, Herr [In you have I put my hope, Lord]

Below is the first verse of the Lutheran hymn In dich hab ich gehoffet, Herr of Adam Reissner with the English translation of Catherine Winkworth.

The text of the hymn is derived from the first six lines of Psalm 31 and was associated with two different melodies, in major and minor keys. The hymn tune in the major key was used many times by Bach, most notably in the funeral cantata BWV 106, the Christmas Oratorio and the St. Matthew Passion. BWV 640 is the only occasion he used the melody in the minor key, which can be traced back to an earlier reformation hymn tune for Christ ist erstanden and medieval plainsong for Christus iam resurrexit.

In Bach's chorale prelude BWV 640, the cantus firmus is in the soprano voice, several times held back for effect. Beneath it the two inner voices—often in thirds—and the pedal provide an accompaniment based on a motif derived from the melody, a falling three-note anapaest consisting of two semiquavers and a quaver. The motif is passed imitatively down through the voices, often developing into more flowing passages of semiquavers; the motif in the pedal has an added quaver and—punctuated by rests—is more fragmentary. The harmonies resulting from the combined voices produce a hymn-like effect.  described the anapaest as a "joy" motif; to Hermann Keller it symbolised "constancy". For , the angular motifs and richer subdued textures in the lower registers are consonant with the "firm hope" of the text, in contrast to more animated evocations of joy.

 BWV 641 Wenn wir in höchsten Nöten sein [When we are in the greatest distress] a 2 Clav. et Ped.

Below are the first two verses of the hymn of Paul Eber with the English translation of Catherine Winkworth.

The cantus firmus of this ornamental chorale prelude was written by Louis Bourgeois in 1543. It was used again the last of the Great Eighteen Chorale Preludes, BWV 668. The accompaniment in the two middle voices, often in parallel sixths, and the pedal is derived from the first four notes of the melody. The highly ornate ornamentation is rare amongst Bach's chorale preludes, the only comparable example being BWV 662 from the Great Eighteen. The vocal ornamentation and portamento appoggiaturas of the melody are French in style.  Coloratura passages lead into the unadorned notes of the cantus firmus.  describes this musical device, used also in BWV 622 and BWV 639, as a means of conveying "a particular kind of touching, inexpressible expressiveness." The prelude has an intimate charm: as Albert Schweitzer commented, the soprano part flows "like a divine song of consolation, and in a wonderful final cadence seems to silence and compose the other parts."

 BWV 642 Wer nur den lieben Gott läßt walten [He who allows dear God to lead him]

Below are the first and last verses of the hymn Wer nur den lieben Gott läßt walten of Georg Neumark with the English translation of Catherine Winkworth.

The melody was also composed by Neumark: it and the text were first published in his hymn book of 1657. The hymn tune was later set to other words, notably "" ("Who knows how near is my end?").  Neumark originally wrote the melody in  time. Bach, however, like Walther, Böhm and Krebs, generally preferred a version in  time for his fourteen settings in chorale preludes and cantatas: it appears in cantatas BWV 21, BWV 27, BWV 84, BWV 88, BWV 93, BWV 166, BWV 179 and BWV 197, with words taken from one or other of the two hymn texts. In the chorale prelude BWV 642, the unadorned cantus firmus in  time is in the soprano voice. The two inner voices, often in thirds, are built on a motif made up of two short beats followed by a long beat—an anapaest—often used by Bach to signify joy (for example in BWV 602, 605, 615, 616, 618, 621, 623, 627, 629, 637 and 640). The pedal has a walking bass which also partly incorporates the joy motif in its responses to the inner voices. For  the accompaniment symbolised "the joyful feeling of confidence in God's goodness." BWV 642 has similarities with the earlier chorale prelude BWV 690 from the Kirnberger collection, with the same affekt of a delayed entry in the second half of the cantus firmus. The compositional structure for all four voices in BWV 642 is close to that of BWV 643.

 BWV 643 Alle Menschen müssen sterben [All mankind must die]

Below are the first and last two verses of the funeral hymn of Johann Georg Albinus with the English translation of Catherine Winkworth.

BWV 643 is one of the most perfect examples of Bach's Orgelbüchlein style. A mood of ecstasy permeates this chorale prelude, a funeral hymn reflecting the theme of heavenly joy. The simple cantus firmus sings in crotchets (quarter notes) above an accompanying motif of three semiquavers (16th notes) followed by two quavers  (eighth notes) that echoes between the two inner parts and the pedal. This figure is also found in the organ works of Georg Böhm and Daniel Vetter from the same era.  describes its use by Bach as a motif of "beatific peace", commenting that "the melody of the hymn that speaks of the inevitability of death is thus enveloped in a motif that is lit up by the coming glory." Despite the harmonious thirds and sixths in the inner parts, the second semiquaver of the motif produces a momentary dissonance that is instantly resolved, again contributing to the mood of joy tinged by sadness. As  comments, "What tender melancholy lurks in the chorale, Alle Menschen müßen sterben, what an indescribable expressiveness, for instance, arises in the last bar from the false relation between c♯ and c', and the almost imperceptible ornamentation of the melody!"

 BWV 644 Ach wie nichtig, ach wie flüchtig''' [Oh how fleeting, oh how feckless]

Below are the first and last verses of Michael Franck's 1652 Lutheran hymn Ach wie flüchtig, ach wie nichtig with the English translation of Sir John Bowring.

The verses of Franck's hymn alternate the order of the words nichtig and flüchtig in their opening lines. Bach's title conforms to a later 1681 hymnbook from Weimar which inverted the order throughout. The chorale prelude is in four voices for single manual with pedals. The cantus firmus in the soprano voice is a simple form of the hymn tune in crotchets. The accompaniment, intricately crafted from two separate motifs in the inner voices and in the pedal, is a particularly fine illustration of Bach's compositional method in the Orgelbüchlein. The motif in the pedal is a constant three-note quaver figure, with octave leaps punctuated by frequent rests. Above this bass, the inner voices weave a continuous pattern of descending and ascending scales in semiquavers, constantly varying, sometimes moving in the same direction and sometimes in contrary motion. This texture of flowing scales over a "quasi-pizzicato" bass captures the theme of the hymn: it is a reflection on the transitory nature of human existence, likened to a mist "gathered in an hour together, and soon dispersed." Similar semiquaver figures had been used in other contemporary settings of this hymn, for example in a set of variations by Böhm

and in the first chorus of Bach's cantata BWV 26, but without conveying the same effect of quiet reflection. To  the scales "hurry by like misty ghosts." Hermann Keller saw the bass motif as representing "the futility of human existence."  Others have suggested that the rests in the pedal part might symbolise the nothingness of ach wie nichtig.  Exceptionally Bach scored the final chord of this nebulous piece without pedal. A similar device has been used by Bach for the word inanes ("empty") in the ninth movement of his Magnificat.  also sees similarities with Bach's omission of a bass part in Wie zittern und wanken from cantata BWV 105, an aria concerned with the uncertainties in the life of a sinner.

 Reception 
The Orgelbüchlein'' was originally passed from teacher to student and was not published in its entirety until Felix Mendelssohn edited an edition.  Notable editions have been made by Robert Clark and John David Peterson, Quentin Faulkner, Albert Riemenschneider, and Albert Schweitzer.

Transcriptions

Discography

Helmut Walcha, Schnitger organ, St Peter and St Paul, Cappel, Lower Saxony (Deutsche Grammophon)
Ton Koopman, Riepp organ, Ottobeuren Abbey (Teldec 214662)
Marie-Claire Alain, Silbermann organ, Freiberg Cathedral (Erato 4509-96759-2)
André Isoir, Ahrend organ in Cantate Domino evangelical church, Frankfurt (Calliope 9711)
Bernard Foccroulle, Schott organ in the Klosterkirche, Muri Abbey (Ricercar)
Peter Hurford, organs of Church of Our Lady of Sorrows, Toronto and St Catharine's College, Cambridge (Decca 443485-2) (with Choir of St John's College, Cambridge singing Walter Emery's 1969 harmonisations of chorales)
Simon Preston,  organ in Sorø Academy, Denmark (Deutsche Grammophon)
Francesco Cera, organ in Church of S. Maria Assunta, Giubasco, Switzerland, (Brillant 94639) (with Swiss Radiotelevision Choir singing each chorale)
René Saorgin, organ in Saint-Pierre de Luxeuil Cathedral, France (Harmonia Mundi HMX 2951215)
Anton Heiller, 1964 Metzler organ in Nestal, Switzerland (Vanguard LPs VCS-10026 & VCS-10027; 1968)

See also
List of compositions by Johann Sebastian Bach
Neumeister Chorales
Schübler Chorales
Great Eighteen Chorale Preludes
Clavier-Übung III
Canonic Variations
Ich ruf zu dir, Herr Jesu Christ, BWV 177

Notes

Sources 

 

, Chapter 22. "Chronology and style in the early works: a background for the Orgelbüchlein"

Further reading

External links
Part 1 and Part 2 of scanned images of the autograph manuscript of the Orgelbüchlein at IMSLP
 
 Free scores on Mutopia of the whole collection of 46 chorale preludes from the Orgelbüchlein.
 Free downloads of the complete Orgelbüchlein recorded by James Kibbie on the 1717 Trost organ, St. Walpurgis, Großengottern, Germany: either search for individual works or download the whole collection
 The Orgelbüchlein Project, a project to complete the missing chorale preludes listed in Bach's original plan.

Chorale preludes by Johann Sebastian Bach
Compositions for organ